Peeter Päkk (born 26 November 1957) is an Estonian sports shooter. He competed in the mixed skeet event at the 1992 Summer Olympics.

References

1957 births
Living people
Estonian male sport shooters
Olympic shooters of Estonia
Shooters at the 1992 Summer Olympics
Sportspeople from Tartu
20th-century Estonian people